Nazareth is a borough in Northampton County, Pennsylvania, United States. The borough's population was 6,053 at the 2020 census.   Nazareth is part of the Lehigh Valley metropolitan area, which had a population of 861,899 and was the 68th most populous metropolitan area in the U.S. as of 2020.

History

Etymology
The borough is named for the Biblical town of Nazareth in Israel, where Jesus spent his youth. The names of a number of other places in the Lehigh Valley area of Pennsylvania are similarly inspired, including Bethlehem, Emmaus, Egypt, and Allentown's Jordan Creek.

18th and 19th centuries
Nazareth was founded in 1740 by Moravian immigrants from Germany. The property was purchased from George Whitefield after the construction of the Whitefield House. Initially, Nazareth was specifically Moravian by charter. Outside faiths were not allowed to purchase property within Nazareth, a  German Protestant community. It was one of the four leading Moravian communities in the Northeastern United States (Bethlehem, Emmaus, and Lititz, each in Pennsylvania, were the three others).

In 1735, a small group of the Moravian missionaries had begun work in the newly settled community of Savannah, Georgia. Their intent was to evangelize the Native American tribes and minister to the settlers. Governor James Oglethorpe, founder of Georgia, and John Wesley and Charles Wesley, founders of the Methodist Church and deeply interested in Moravian ideals, came along on the same boat.  The Brethren settled along the Savannah River in Georgia.  Like the Quakers, the Brethren refused to take part in the war with the Spanish and, as a result, they were evicted from Georgia in 1739.

George Whitefield, a widely known itinerant preacher who had served for a time as chaplain of Savannah, brought the group of evicted Georgia Brethren north to Philadelphia in his sloop.  Whitefield had grandiose plans, and one of them was for a school for Negro children to be established on his tract of  called the Barony of Nazareth.  He invited the Brethren who accompanied him to Philadelphia to settle at this location for the time being and hired them to build his school.  By the end of June, 1739, the first log dwelling was erected. The workers struggled, the weather proved difficult, and winter soon arrived. They quickly erected a second log house. After its completion, word came that Whitefield had returned to Pennsylvania, bristling and angered by theological disputes with certain Moravians, particularly on the issue of predestination. He evicted the Moravian Brethren.

While evicted from the Barony, Moravian leaders in England were negotiating to buy the entire Barony.  When Whitefield's business manager suddenly died, Whitefield discovered that his finances, shaky on more than one occasion, would not allow him to proceed with his Nazareth plan.  He was forced to sell the whole tract.  On July 16, 1741, it officially became Moravian property.

Nazareth was originally planned as a central English-speaking church village.  But in October 1742, its 18 English inhabitants departed for Philadelphia.  Meanwhile, the Nazareth tract was largely in the hand of Captain John, a Lenape chieftain who (along with his followers) refused to leave, even though they no longer owned the land.  In December 1742, Count Zinzendorf, a Moravian benefactor, made a settlement with Captain John, and whose tribe moved back into the hinterland. During 1743, the still unfinished Whitefield House was put in readiness for 32 young married couples who were to arrive from Europe.  On the second day of the new year, 1744, the couples went overland to Nazareth to settle in the nearly completed Whitefield House. The Whitefield House and adjacent Gray Cottage now belong to the Moravian Historical Society.

The result was that Nazareth began to increase in population. Enough visitors were attracted to the town that the Rose Inn was built in 1752 on an additional tract to the north.  Finally, in 1754, Nazareth Hall was built in hopes that Count Zinzendorf would return from Europe and settle in Nazareth permanently, but he never returned to the Americas. However, in 1759 Nazareth Hall became the central boarding school for sons of Moravian parents. It later attained wide fame as a "classical academy."  This eventually led to the founding, in 1807, of Moravian College and Theological Seminary, now located in Bethlehem.  The Nazareth Hall Tract was added to the National Register of Historic Places in 1980.

20th and 21st centuries
Up until the mid-1900s, a large part of Nazareth's population was of German origin, better known as the Pennsylvania Dutch. "Dutch" is a corruption of the word "Deutsch", which is German for "German."  The Pennsylvania Dutch were spread throughout many counties of southern and central Pennsylvania. Many Pennsylvania Dutch also came from Switzerland and the Alsace region of France, in addition to the modern nation of Germany,

Nazareth's residents' religion reflected a largely German background in evangelical churches of fairly large sizes for such a small town, divided among the Moravian, Lutheran, Reformed (now part of the United Church of Christ), and Roman Catholic worship centers of the town. The town also hosted a fairly sizable Italian and Polish population, which largely attended Holy Family Catholic Church, in the area.

During a great immigration to the eastern Pennsylvania counties of the late 1900s from New Jersey and New York, the population expanded significantly. Developers from the New Jersey area were responding to tighter controls and regulations on new construction in the state of New Jersey by moving their enterprises to Pennsylvania.

This new expansion and housing boom was enabled by the local completion of the interstate system of highways, first begun by former U.S. President Dwight Eisenhower in the 1950s. In the Nazareth area, this was caused by the completion of the nearby Pennsylvania Route 33, which ran north and south, thereby connecting Interstate 78, U.S. Route 22, and Interstate 80, all of which ran east–west, and the completion of the Interstate 78 southern Lehigh Valley corridor high speed interstate, which connected the Lehigh Valley to New Jersey and New York City to the east and Harrisburg and Pittsburgh to the west.

The Nazareth Historic District was added to the National Register of Historic Places in 1988.

Demographics

As of the census of 2000, there were 6,023 people, 2,560 households, and 1,515 families residing in the borough. The population density was 3,603.8 people per square mile (1,392.5/km2). There were 2,658 housing units at an average density of 1,590.4 per square mile (614.5/km2). The racial makeup of the borough was 98.46% White, 0.55% African American, 0.08% Native American, 0.40% Asian, 0.28% from other races, and 0.23% from two or more races. Hispanic or Latino of any race were 0.95% of the population.

There were 2,560 households, out of which 25.1% had children under the age of 18 living with them, 47.1% were married couples living together, 8.9% had a female householder with no husband present, and 40.8% were non-families. 35.5% of all households were made up of individuals, and 19.3% had someone living alone who was 65 years of age or older. The average household size was 2.22 and the average family size was 2.89. Nazareth's population is spread out, with 20.2% under the age of 18, 6.7% from 18 to 24, 28.7% from 25 to 44, 20.0% from 45 to 64, and 24.4% who were 65 years of age or older. The median age was 41 years. For every 100 females there were 85.3 males. For every 100 females age 18 and over, there were 80.7 males.

As of the 2000 census, the median income for a household in the borough was $39,038, and the median income for a family was $50,298. Males had a median income of $35,642 versus $24,900 for females. The per capita income for the borough was $21,292. About 4.2% of families and 8.0% of the population were below the poverty line, including 9.3% of those under age 18 and 11.4% of those age 65 or over. In 1900, 2,304 people lived there, and in 1910, 3,978 inhabitants existed; 5,721 people lived in Nazareth in 1940.  Its population was 6,023 at the 2000 census.

Geography
Nazareth is located at  (40.739993, -75.311214).

Nazareth's climate is similar to the rest of the Lehigh Valley with four distinct seasons, humid summers, cold winters, and very short and mild springs and falls. The hardiness zone is 6b. Nazareth's topography can best be described as hilly, as the town itself sits atop a local outcropping underground of one of the richest veins of limestone in the U.S. Much of the farmland surrounding Nazareth is being converted into close sitting lots of suburban housing, for predominantly commuter households.

Transportation

Pennsylvania Route 191 and Pennsylvania Route 248 are the numbered highways serving Nazareth. PA 248 follows Easton Road along an east-west alignment across the southern edge of the borough. PA 191 follows a southwest-northeast alignment via Easton Road, Broad Street, Center Street and New Street, including a short concurrency with PA 248.

Public education 

Nazareth Borough is served by the Nazareth Area School District, which also comprises the surrounding Townships of Bushkill, Upper Nazareth and Lower Nazareth, and the boroughs of Tatamy, and Stockertown. Students in grades nine through 12 attend Nazareth Area High School.

The district's schools include:
 Lower Nazareth Elementary
 Floyd R. Shafer Elementary
 Kenneth N. Butz Jr Elementary
 Nazareth Area Intermediate School
 Nazareth Area Middle School
 Nazareth Area High School

Media
News about the Nazareth community is reported regularly in regional newspapers The Morning Call and The Express-Times daily newspapers and local shoppers, including The Nazareth Times, The Home News, and The Key.

Nazareth Speedway

Nazareth was home to the Nazareth Speedway, a one-mile tri-oval automobile racing course. The track opened in 1910 and closed in 2004, and the site has remained vacant ever since. Nazareth is also home to racing champions Mario Andretti and Michael Andretti, and third-generation driver Marco Andretti.

Industry

Kraemer Textiles Inc.

Kraemer Textiles Inc., which started out as a silk hosiery maker in 1887, is based in Nazareth. Over the years, the company changed to spinning yarns out of manmade and natural fibers for clients to use in the manufacture of upholstery, clothing, and home furnishings. The company creates and markets its own brand of handicraft yarns under the Kraemer Yarns label. The company also spun the Merino wool yarn that was used in creating the end-to-end American-made sweaters produced by the Ralph Lauren Corporation for the athletes of the 2014 Winter Olympics.

Martin Guitar

Nazareth is the global headquarters for C.F. Martin & Company, which manufactures Martin guitars.  Martin guitars are handmade instruments that once were made by artisans who apprenticed for years to learn their trade.  Now, Martin Guitars are made largely on an assembly line monitored and assisted by workers, computers, and lasers. Assembly lines at Martin were instituted to lower costs, improve speed of production, and compete with foreign manufacturers, without which efforts it is said that the company would have ceased to survive.

Cement manufacturing
In the 1960s, at least three large cement companies surrounded the Nazareth borough area, Essroc (formally Coplay Cement), Hercules Cement, and Penn-Dixie Cement Companies. The Coplay plant on the south side has undergone company ownership changes through the years (and was also known as the Nazareth Cement Company, among other names). Hundreds of union laborers of the United Gypsum, Lime and Cement Unions worked in each plant around the town from the early 1900s.

Stories of the hard pre-union days at the cement plants are replete with the description of twelve-hour days for survival wages, poor working and health conditions, and many dangerous incidents and accidents causing loss of life and or limb without medical plans or benefits to survivors. Since the 1980s, however, the automation of the plants and eventual reselling of them to foreign firms has brought about the loss of most of the high-paying union cement jobs, presenting a blow to the Lehigh Valley economy.  The impact on the local economy of these lost cement jobs was intensified by the ultimate closing of neighboring Bethlehem Steel in 2003. In the case of Bethlehem Steel, it was not automation and modernization that downsized the workforce, but failure to modernize the mills, overloaded management, and a laissez-faire management attitude about foreign competition and cheap foreign steel production.

Notable people

 Marco Andretti, professional IndyCar Series race car driver
 Mario Andretti, 1967 Daytona 500 winner, 1969 Indy 500 winner, 1978 Formula One champion, 1984 IndyCar Series champion, and 29-time Indy 500 starter 
 Michael Andretti, 1991 IndyCar Series champion, Formula One race car driver and IndyCar Series team owner
 Jahan Dotson, professional football player, Washington Commanders
 Sage Karam, professional NASCAR Xfinity Series race car driver
 Joe Kovacs, track and field athlete, Olympic silver medalist, world champion in shot put
 Christian Frederick Martin, founder of guitar manufacturer C. F. Martin & Company
 Kate Micucci, actress, comedian, artist, and singer-songwriter
 Jordan White, rock musician

In popular culture
"The Weight" is a popular 1968 song by The Band that takes the motif of an out-of-town traveler who arrives in a "Nazareth" and the people he encounters there, including the Devil. The Scottish band Nazareth later took their name from the song.
Mark Knopfler wrote a 2000 song about a season of racing at Nazareth Speedway titled "Speedway At Nazareth". The song appears on Knopfler's second solo album, Sailing to Philadelphia.
 Nazareth native Mario Andretti is mentioned in several popular songs, including "Uneasy Rider" by Charlie Daniels (1973), "Shadrach" by the Beastie Boys (1989), "Good for Me" by Amy Grant (1992), "Drive (For Daddy Gene)" by Alan Jackson (2002), and "Crash" by Gwen Stefani (2004).

See also
 Indian Tower

References

External links 

 
 Nazareth news at The Morning Call

Boroughs in Northampton County, Pennsylvania
Boroughs in Pennsylvania
Moravian settlement in Pennsylvania
Populated places established in 1740